Dadan River is a right tributary of the Jinsha River in Yunnan, Southwestern China. It is 102.4 km long in total, with a watershed area of 1,888 square kilometers.

Overview
Dadan River rises in the western Binchuan County, the  upper course is called Waxi River (Wǎxī hé) or Binju River (Bīnjū hé). The middle course of it is called Sangyuan River (Sāngyuán hé) or Naxi River (Nàxī hé) and flows through the Binchuan County from south to north. 

The lower course of it is located in southern Yongsheng County. The river has a length of 102.4 km and drains an area of 1,888 square km. 

The River has also spots for fishing such as Yongsheng, Lijiang, Yunnan.

References

Jinsha River
Rivers of Yunnan
Geography of Lijiang
Geography of Dali Bai Autonomous Prefecture